JP Morgan Japanese Investment Trust is a large British investment trust dedicated to investments in Japan. Established in 1955, the company is a constituent of the FTSE 250 Index. The chairman is Chris Samuel.

References

External links
  Official site

Financial services companies established in 1955
Investment trusts of the United Kingdom
JPMorgan Chase
Investment in Japan